Artley is a surname. Notable people with the surname include:

 Brad Artley, American drummer
 Bob Artley (1917–2011), American cartoonist
 Meredith Artley, American journalist

English-language surnames
English toponymic surnames
Surnames of English origin